Stroke of genius may refer to:
 Epiphany (feeling), an experience of a sudden and striking realization
 Eureka effect, suddenly understanding a previously incomprehensible problem or concept
 Flash of genius, an obsolete doctrine in US patent law
 Flash of Genius (film), a 2008 film about the legal doctrine
 Bobby Jones: Stroke of Genius, a 2004 biographical drama film about golfer Bobby Jones